Arjumand Ara is an Indian professor of Urdu literature at University of Delhi. She is a translator, critic and a scholar of humanities. She has translated Findings, Keepings: Life, Communism and Everything, biography of eminent Urdu Scholar Ralph Russell into Urdu. In 2021, She has received Sahitya Akademi Translation Prize for translating Arundhati Roy's English novel The Ministry of Utmost Happiness into Urdu.

Alma Mater 
Jawaharlal Nehru University, Delhi

References

External links 
 http://minds.wisconsin.edu/handle/1793/38101?show=full
 http://www.urdustudies.com/pdf/24/21MoltenoRRbiblio.pdf
 https://rekhta.org/poets/arjumand-ara/ebooks
 https://www.academia.edu/15352662/Ralph_Russell_A_Tribute

Urdu-language translators
Academic staff of Delhi University
Living people
Year of birth missing (living people)
Recipients of the Sahitya Akademi Prize for Translation